Long Live the King is a 1923 American silent drama film directed by Victor Schertzinger and starring Jackie Coogan. The film is based on the 1917 novel of the same name by Mary Roberts Rinehart. It was produced and released by Metro Pictures and was Coogan's first film for Metro Pictures.

Cast

Survival status
A print of Long Live the King survives in Gosfilmofond.

References

External links

Lantern slide

1923 films
American silent feature films
Films directed by Victor Schertzinger
Metro Pictures films
Films based on American novels
American black-and-white films
Silent American drama films
1923 drama films
Films set in Europe
Films based on works by Mary Roberts Rinehart
1920s American films